A total lunar eclipse took place on Wednesday, December 9, 1992, the second of two lunar eclipses in 1992, the first was a partial lunar eclipse on Monday, June 15.

Visibility 

It is visibly seen throughout the world including Americas (North and South America), Europe, Africa, Asia and Western Australia (including western New Guinea). The lunar eclipse was witnessed in the Philippines on the midday hours of December 10, two years after the total lunar eclipse happened on February 9, 1990.

According to Fred Espenak, this was the darkest eclipse in a decade, caused by the June 15, 1991 eruptions of Mount Pinatubo in the Philippines.

Related eclipses

Eclipses of 1992 
 An annular solar eclipse (ascending node) on January 4.
 A partial lunar eclipse (ascending node) on June 15.
 A total solar eclipse (descending node) on June 30.
 A total lunar eclipse (descending node) on December 9.
 A partial solar eclipse (ascending node) on December 24.

Lunar year series

Saros series 

This is the 17th of 26 total lunar eclipses in series 125. The previous occurrence was on November 29, 1974 and the next will occur on December 21, 2010.

Half-Saros cycle
A lunar eclipse will be preceded and followed by solar eclipses by 9 years and 5.5 days (a half saros). This lunar eclipse is related to two annular solar eclipses of Solar Saros 132.

Tritos series
 Preceded: Lunar eclipse of January 9, 1982
 Followed: Lunar eclipse of November 9, 2003

Tzolkinex 
 Preceded: Lunar eclipse of October 7, 1949
 Followed: Lunar eclipse of December 30, 1963

See also 
List of lunar eclipses
List of 20th-century lunar eclipses

Notes

External links 
 
 Lunar Eclipse Photo Gallery 1  1982 - 1993 Photographs by Fred Espenak

1992-12
1992 in science
December 1992 events